"Little Darling (I Need You)" is a 1966 single written and produced by Holland-Dozier-Holland and recorded and released by Marvin Gaye on the Tamla label.

Background
This song was released after the modest success of the Miracles-produced single "Take This Heart of Mine" in hopes that Gaye's work with the hit-making trio Holland-Dozier-Holland would bring him back to the pop top ten.

Similarly conceived with the same musical background as their previous collaboration, "How Sweet It Is (To Be Loved by You)", the song has the singer declaring to his woman to stay beside him promising her that he'll be "(her) number-one fool".

Billboard described the song as a "swinger that should have no trouble making a rapid chart climb," with "strong material and performance."  Cash Box said that it is a "wailing throbber with a built-in zoom quality."

While it reached the top forty of the Billboard Top R&B Singles chart peaking at number sixteen, it did not perform as well as "Take This Heart of Mine" on the pop charts, peaking at number 47.

Chart performance

Marvin Gaye personnel
Marvin Gaye - lead vocals
The Andantes (Marlene Barrow, Jackie Hicks, Louvain Demps) - backing vocals
The Funk Brothers - instrumentation

Doobie Brothers recording
In 1977, The Doobie Brothers, included their recording on their Livin' on the Fault Line LP.  In the US, this recording went to #48 on the Hot 100.

Chart performance

The Doobie Brothers personnel
Michael McDonald –  keyboards, vocals
Patrick Simmons –  guitar, backing vocals
Jeff "Skunk" Baxter - guitar
Tiran Porter  –  bass guitar, backing vocals
Keith Knudsen – drums, backing vocals
John Hartman – drums

Additional musicians
Ted Templeman – tambourine
Bobby LaKind – congas, backing vocals
Rosemary Butler – backing vocals
David Paich – horn and string arrangement

References

1966 singles
Marvin Gaye songs
Tamla Records singles
Songs written by Holland–Dozier–Holland
1965 songs
Song recordings produced by Lamont Dozier
Song recordings produced by Brian Holland
Warner Records singles